National Highway 727B, commonly referred to as NH 727B is a national highway in India. It is a secondary route of National Highway 27.  NH-727B runs in the state of Uttar Pradesh in India.

Route 
NH727B connects Fazilnagar, Tamkuhi, Bhingari, Bhatpar Rani, Salempur, Esharou, Bhagalpur, Ubhaon, Sikandrapur, Baheri, Sukhpura, Hanumanganj and Ballia in the state of Uttar Pradesh.

Junctions  

  Terminal near Fazilnagar.
  near Salempur
  near Karmi Juned
  Terminal near Ballia.

See also 
 List of National Highways in India
 List of National Highways in India by state

References

External links 

 NH 727B on OpenStreetMap

National highways in India
National Highways in Uttar Pradesh